The Abduction of the Sabine Women is a 1928 German silent comedy film directed by Robert Land and starring Ralph Arthur Roberts, Ida Wüst and Teddy Bill. It was based on a play of the same name which had had several film adaptations.

The film's sets were designed by the art director Robert Neppach.

Cast

See also
 The Abduction of the Sabine Women (1936)
 Romulus and the Sabines (Italy, 1945)
 The Abduction of the Sabine Women (1954)

References

Bibliography

External links

1928 films
Films of the Weimar Republic
Films directed by Robert Land
German silent feature films
1928 comedy films
German comedy films
German films based on plays
Films about theatre
German black-and-white films
Silent comedy films
1920s German films